Another Step is the debut album from the Manchester indie rock band City Reign, released 25 February 2013. The album was recorded in St Trinity Church, Salford with producer Sam Jones.
The album was released on the band's own record label Car Boot Records.
Before the album was released, the track "Ahead of Ideas" was released as a single in 2012.  Another song on the album Anchor was debuted on BBC Radio 6 Music by Steve Lamacq on 28 January 2013.

Another Step was recorded and mixed by Sam Jones at St Trinity Church, Salford and Band on The Wall, Manchester.  It was mastered by Paul O'Brien at POB Audio, Manchester. The photograph for the cover was created by Louise Cowley.

Track listing

Credits 

 Produced by Sam Jones
 Recorded and mixed by Sam Jones at St Trinity Church, Salford and Band on The Wall, Manchester
 Mastered by Paul O'Brien at POB Audio, Manchester
 Photography by Louise Cowley

References 

2013 albums